"Suspicious Man" (Hangul: 수상한 남자) is a song by South Korean singer and actress Lee Jung-hyun. It was released on May 11, along with her 7th Korean album, 007th.

Charts

References

2010 songs
Korean-language songs